Selina Fay Mosinski (born 16 September 1981) is an English comedian, actress and internet personality. She is best known for portraying the fictional charity shop manager Sue Tuke, better known as Charity Shop Sue. Mosinski first appeared as the character in the online web series Charity Shop Sue which was filmed in 2014 and distributed in October 2019 set in a fictional charity shop in Bulwell, Nottingham. Since the show's success, the character has become popular within the LGBT community, as an internet personality and has made several television appearances including on RuPaul's Drag Race UK and MTV Cribs UK as well as appearing in an online comedy segment for  Strictly Come Dancing.

Career
In 2014, Mosinski starred in Charity Shop Sue, an online comedy web series created, written and directed by Stuart Edwards, Timothy Chesney and Matthew Chesney. It is set in the fictional charity shop Sec*hand Chances in Bulwell, Nottingham in which Mosinski plays the role of Sue Tuke, a former fashion stylist in her fifties who previously worked for multiple celebrities in Paris and Milan and is now a domineering, power-hungry and borderline sociopathic manager who is constantly coming up with new ideas in an attempt to boost the failing shop's image and custom, and is often undermining her co-workers Vera Goodard (Joyce Townsley) and Kersch Callahan (Sherrie Johnson) whilst having a manipulative hold over assistant Viki Wilson (Nicola Harness). The series follows Charity Shop Sue inviting a cameraman in to film the goings on in the shop and her attempts to make money. The final episode sees Sue refuse to partake in any further filming. The character began gaining online popularity as far back as 2017, due to the character uploading comedy videos on social media sites such as Instagram and Twitter, with one clip where Sue exclaims "Scuse me laydeh, you're supposed to be on the bloody till" to her assistant Viki. In 2017, a Christmas special was filmed which featured a cameo from actress Vicky McClure, who also hails from Nottingham. Such was the character's popularity, the online series was posted to YouTube in October 2019, which featured eighteen episodes.

Mosinski has made several television appearances as Charity Shop Sue. In November 2019, she was one of the celebrities to join Rylan Clark-Neal during his 24-hour Ka-RY-oke challenge for Children in Need. She also attended the wrap party of first series of RuPaul's Drag Race UK and In March 2021, hosted the final VIQ private screening with the finalists of the second series where Lawrence Chaney was revealed as the winner. In the third series of RuPaul's Drag Race UK, drag queen Krystal Versace, who went on to win the series, portrayed Mosinski in character as Charity Shop Sue in the Snatch Game. The following episode, Mosinski herself appeared as the character as part of the charity shop chic runway challenge. In July 2020, she appeared on the Comedy Central series Dragony Aunts, hosted by Crystal Rasmussen and Candy Warhol. In August 2021, she appeared on MTV Cribs UK, showing viewers around her home in Nottingham.

Charity Shop Sue is popular with the LGBT community and has become a staple of gay culture. Mosinski appears as the character annually at Nottinghamshire Pride. In 2021 and 2022, she appeared at the "Mighty Hoopla" event at Brockwell Park. In June 2022, she appeared at the Victoria Centre in Nottingham to celebrate its 50th anniversary. She also appeared at that years' Manchester Pride, performing on the Alan Turing stage on 28 August.

Filmography

References

External links
 
 

1981 births
21st-century English actresses
21st-century English comedians
Actresses from Derbyshire
British Internet celebrities 
English web series actresses
English women comedians
Living people